War Metal Battle Master is the third studio album by Chicago-based sludge/thrash metal band Lair of the Minotaur. There was a music video recorded for the title track, which was directed by Gary Smithson.

Track listing
All lyrics and music written by Steven Rathbone.

 Horde of Undead Vengeance - 4:42
 War Metal Battle Master - 3:28
 When the Ice Giants Slayed All - 3:08
 Slaughter the Bestial Legion - 5:04
 Black Viper Barbarian Clan - 3:35
 Assassins of the Cursed Mist - 5:18
 Doomtrooper - 9:45
 Hades Unleashed - 4:31

Note
The LP version of this album includes a bonus track at the end of side one (after Track 4), called "Terror Tyrannus".

Personnel

Steven Rathbone - Vocals, guitar and mixing
D.J. Barraca - Bass
Chris Wozniak - Drums
Steve Moore - synth on "Doomtrooper"
Sanford Parker - Mixing, executive production
Jeremy Mohler - Illustrations
Erica Barraca - Photos
Seldon Hunt - Layout
Scott Hull - Mastering

References

2008 albums
Southern Lord Records albums
Lair of the Minotaur albums